The Philippine Basketball Association (PBA) is a men's professional basketball league in the Philippines composed of twelve company-branded franchised teams. Founded in 1975, it is the first professional basketball league in Asia and is the second oldest continuously professional basketball league existing in the world after the NBA, established before the "open era" of basketball in 1990 where FIBA allowed longstanding domestic leagues, which mostly had predated the PBA, to become professional. The league's regulations are a hybrid of rules from the NBA and FIBA.

The league played its first game at the Araneta Coliseum in Quezon City on April 9, 1975. Its main office is located along Eulogio Rodriguez Jr. Avenue (C-5 road), Eastwood City, Bagumbayan, Quezon City.

The San Miguel Beermen have the most PBA championships with 28 titles. After the 2022–23 Commissioner's Cup, the Barangay Ginebra San Miguel, who defeated guest team Bay Area Dragons 4–3 in the 2022–23 Commissioner's Cup Finals, are the defending Commissioner's Cup champions.

History 

The Philippine Basketball Association was founded when nine teams left the now-defunct Manila Industrial and Commercial Athletic Association (MICAA), which was tightly controlled by the Basketball Association of the Philippines (BAP), the FIBA-recognized national association at the time. With the BAP controlling the MICAA, the league was de jure amateur, as players were only paid allowances. This is much like what was done in other countries to circumvent the amateur requirement and to play in FIBA-sanctioned tournaments such as the Olympics. MICAA team owners were not pleased with how BAP (then led by Gonzalo "Lito" Puyat) were taking away their players to join the national team without consulting them first. On January 23, 1975, Mariwasa-Noritake Porcelainmakers' team owner, Emerson Coseteng, together with Carrier Weathermakers, Toyota Comets, Seven-Up Uncolas and Presto Ice Cream announced the formation of the PBA.  The Crispa Redmanizers, Royal Tru-Orange, Tanduay Distillery, and the U/Tex Weavers later joined the upcoming professional league. Leopoldo Prieto, the coach for the Philippines at the 1956 Melbourne Olympics, was appointed as the first commissioner and Coseteng was chosen as the first president of the league's Board of Governors. The first game of the league was held at the Araneta Coliseum on April 9, 1975, featuring Mariwasa-Noritake and Concepcion Carrier.

The league's first 10 years was known for the intense rivalry of the Crispa Redmanizers and the Toyota Tamaraws, still considered one of the greatest rivalries in league history. Big names such as Robert Jaworski, Ramon Fernandez, Francis Arnaiz, Atoy Co, Bogs Adornado and Philip Cezar played for those squads before the two teams disbanded in 1983 and 1984 respectively. Following their disbandment, the league moved from the Araneta Coliseum to ULTRA in Pasig. There, the league continued to be popular, as several former Toyota and Crispa players suited up for different teams.

During the mid to late 1980s, Jaworski and Ginebra San Miguel became the league's most popular squad for their "never say die" attitude. The team had intense rivalries with the Tanduay Rhum Masters, which was led by Jaworski's ex-Toyota teammate-turned-rival Fernandez, and later the expansion Purefoods Corporation and younger players Alvin Patrimonio, Jerry Codiñera, Jojo Lastimosa and Fernandez (who moved from Tanduay).

By the end of the 1980s, San Miguel Beer won numerous championships that included the 1989 Grand Slam, led by coach Norman Black and former national team stars Samboy Lim and Hector Calma.

In 1989, FIBA voted to allow professionals to play in their sanctioned tournaments, hence the PBA's players are now able to represent the country internationally. In 1990, the league sent its first all-professional squad to the Asian Games, earning a silver medal. The PBA would later send three more all-pro squads to the event.

The early 1990s saw Ginebra and Shell forming an intense rivalry that included Ginebra's walkout in 1990 finals against Shell and the team's dramatic comeback from a 3–1 deficit to beat Shell in the 1991 First Conference. Patrimonio, Allan Caidic, and a host of others became the league's main attraction.

By 1993, the league moved to the Cuneta Astrodome in Pasay and later saw the Alaska Milkmen win the 1996 grand slam and nine titles in the decade.

From 1999 to 2000, the PBA endured controversy. Several expatriate cagers arrived on the scene (such as Asi Taulava, Danny Seigle and Eric Menk). Their lineage was questionable and most of them were deported for falsifying documents. The arrival of dozens of these players was a counter to the fledgling Metropolitan Basketball Association, a regional-based professional league formed in 1998. After ABS-CBN's 2001 abandonment, the MBA faced mounting expenses and would fold within a year. Despite the MBA's disbandment and the arrival of those players to the PBA, attendance went sour for the PBA in 2002 and was even worse the following year.

In 2004, the league introduced drastic scheduling changes, when it decided to begin the season in October instead of January. The change in starting the season allowed the league to accommodate international tournaments held from June to September and it fit better with college hoops, the NCAA and the UAAP, whose seasons run from June to October. The league also reduced the number of conferences from three to two, renaming the All-Filipino Cup as the Philippine Cup and introducing a new import laden tournament named as the Fiesta Conference. To accommodate these changes, a transitional tournament, the 2004 PBA Fiesta Conference was held from February to July, which was won by the Barangay Ginebra Kings. The league also began to hold the annual All-Star weekend in the provinces, alternating from Luzon and Visayas/Mindanao provinces every year.

The league regained some popularity by this year, thanks in large part to Barangay Ginebra's three PBA championships led by Eric Menk, Jayjay Helterbrand and Mark Caguioa. Solid marketing and arrival of collegiate stars from the UAAP and the NCAA also worked in the PBA's favor.

By 2005, the league would take on the role of Philippine national representation under Chot Reyes, when FIBA lifted the suspension of the country following the formation of the Samahang Basketbol ng Pilipinas despite a ninth-place finish in the 2007 FIBA Asia Championship. In 2009, however, the all-amateur Smart Gilas team became the country's official representative in international competitions. The PBA's role in forming a national team was thus reduced to sending up reinforcements to beef up the national squad.

After the appointment of Chito Salud, son of former commissioner Rudy Salud as the commissioner of the PBA, the league returned the three-conference format starting in the 2010–11 season. This also ushered the return of the previously retired conferences, the Commissioner's and Governors' cups.

The beginning of the 2010s also saw the dominance of the Talk 'N Text Tropang Texters, who nearly got the Grand Slam in the 2010–11 season and won the Philippine Cup in three consecutive years (2010–11, 2011–12, 2012–13) enabling them to permanently keep possession of the Jun Bernardino Trophy, the trophy given to the Philippine Cup champions.

On May 19, 2013, the third game of the PBA Commissioner's Cup Finals between the Alaska Aces and the Barangay Ginebra San Miguel set the all-time basketball attendance record of 23,436 at the Smart Araneta Coliseum, which broke the previous record of 23,108 set 11 days earlier that featured the semifinals series doubleheader between Alaska vs. San Mig Coffee and Barangay Ginebra vs. Talk 'N Text. This record was eventually broken on February 12, 2014, when the seventh game of the 2013–14 PBA Philippine Cup Semifinals series between Barangay Ginebra San Miguel and San Mig Super Coffee Mixers set the all-time basketball attendance record of 24,883.

The 2013–14 season became historic as the San Mig Super Coffee Mixers became the fourth team to win the Grand Slam. Tim Cone, the coach of the Coffee Mixers also made history when he became the first coach to win two Grand Slams.

For the 2014–15 season, the league expanded to twelve teams, after accepting two new franchises: Kia Sorento and Blackwater Elite. The league held its opening ceremonies at the Philippine Arena and set an all-time Philippine basketball attendance record of 52,612. This record was eventually broken during the Game 7 of the 2022–23 Commissioner's Cup Finals, contested between the Barangay Ginebra San Miguel and guest team Bay Area Dragons, which was also held in the Philippine Arena with an attendance of 54,589.

On February 15, 2015, in the middle of the 2014–15 PBA season, commissioner Chito Salud announced that he would step down as the league's commissioner and was succeeded by Chito Narvasa starting the 2015–16 PBA season. Salud was then appointed as the President and CEO of the league, when the board of governors decided to restructure the league and create the President/CEO position to manage the league's marketing, expansion and business-related matters. The Commissioner (who will also be the league's Chief Operating Officer) will handle game-related matters.

Salud, however, also stepped down as the league's president and CEO on December 31, 2015, and was replaced by incumbent PBA chairman Robert Non. The board of governors later appointed Chito Narvasa as the President and CEO. The said position was eventually dissolved before the start of the 2016 Governors' Cup.

Amid controversies during his term, Narvasa stepped down on December 31, 2017. The board appointed Media Bureau chief Willie Marcial as his replacement on January 25, 2018.

Upon the onset of the COVID-19 pandemic in March 2020, the league was forced to postpone their games for the 2020 season just three after holding their opening ceremonies. It is not until October that the league was able to resume the Philippine Cup at Angeles, Pampanga in a bubble setup. This was the first time that the league held only one tournament in a season.

The opening of the 2021 season was planned to open in January 2021 but was also delayed to July 2021 due to the rising cases of COVID-19 caused by the virus' Delta variant. The games were initially played at the Ynares Sports Arena in Pasig in a semi-bubble type setup but due to another case surge in Metro Manila in August, the games were moved to the Don Honorio Ventura State University in Bacolor Pampanga. The 2021 Governors' Cup was started in December in a semi-bubble type setup in Ynares Sports Arena in Pasig. After two weeks, the Quezon City government approved the league's proposal to play their games with a limited number of audience at the Smart Araneta Coliseum. The league postponed indefinitely the scheduled games for January 2022 due to the increasing number of COVID-19 cases brought by the Omicron variant.

On February 16, 2022, Alaska Milk Corporation which owned the Alaska Aces announced that the team would leave the PBA at the end of the 2021 Governors' Cup after 35 years in the league and winning 14 championships. Alaska played their last game on March 19, 2022 with a loss to the NLEX Road Warriors in the quarterfinals. A ceremony was held shortly after the game to mark the Alaska's departure from the PBA. The team was later sold to Converge ICT, to which it was named Converge FiberXers.

In September 2022, after another round of negotiations finished on Friday in Tokyo, the Philippine Basketball Association and the Japan B. League will keep looking for methods to maintain their relationship and mutual understanding. 

When the two sides met at the B.League office next to Koishikawa Korakuen Garden, the 47-year-old league, led by Board chairman Ricky Vargas and commissioner Willie Marcial, presented a six-point discussion to their Japanese counterparts, led by chairman Shinji Shimada.

Competition format

Selection of teams 
When the PBA was created, it was from the nine clubs representing different companies that seceded from the Manila Industrial and Commercial Athletic Association (MICAA). The PBA adopted the MICAA's "franchise system" akin to North American sports, only that instead of geographic regions, teams represent companies. Several teams have disbanded and entered the league. Disbandment of a team usually occurs if its mother company regularly sustains financial losses, or for non-sporting reasons, causing it to sell the team to another company. Aside from buying an already-existing team, a company can enter the PBA via an expansion team.

An aspiring team seeking to join the PBA had to be approved by majority of the existing teams. There is a lockout provision, which enables a team to veto the entry of a franchise team whose company is a direct competitor that of one of the existing team's business.

Previously, a company is allowed only one team, with each team having one vote in the Board of Governors; with the acquisition of La Tondeña Distillers (now Ginebra San Miguel) by the San Miguel Corporation (SMC) in 1987, this caused the SMC to have two "sister" teams: the San Miguel Beermen and the Ginebra San Miguel (now the Barangay Ginebra San Miguel). At this point, Ginebra coach Robert Jaworski had autonomy on the decisions on his team, so the situation of SMC having sister teams was tolerated. In 1998, Jaworski ran and won for a Senate seat; this caused him to delegate coaching duties to his longtime deputy Rino Salazar. By this time, Danding Cojuangco has seized control of SMC, and he added Allan Caidic to Ginebra from San Miguel. Jaworski disapproved of this, and resigned.

In 2001 the Ayala Corporation sold its Purefoods-Hormel unit, which included the Purefoods TJ Hotdogs team, to SMC. Later that year, RFM Corporation sold its Cosmos Bottling Corporation, including the Pop Cola Panthers team, to Coca-Cola Bottlers Philippines, a subsidiary of SMC, rechristening them as the Coca-Cola Tigers, and giving SMC four teams. The PBA approved this arrangement, with SMC getting two votes in the Board of Governors instead of four. In 2006, SMC sold back its Coca-Cola unit to the Atlanta-based Coca-Cola Company, and sold the now renamed Powerade Tigers to Sultan 900, Inc., becoming the GlobalPort Batang Pier, decreasing their teams to three.

By 2010, Manuel V. Pangilinan has owned the Talk 'N Text Phone Pals team via the Pilipino Telephone Company. Pangilinan, who had controlling ownership in Meralco, bought the Sta. Lucia Realtors team, rechristening them as the Meralco Bolts. His NLEX Corporation then bought the Air21 Express team in 2014, becoming the NLEX Road Warriors. This has made Cojuangco and Pangilinan own three teams each out of the 12 teams in the PBA by 2014.

This closed system, while unlike the open European model of promotion and relegation, allows teams from other leagues to carryover some of players to the PBA, if they are given this concession, such as in 2006 when the Welcoat Dragons were allowed to carry over three players from their Philippine Basketball League team.

The PBA also allows "guest teams", or teams not represented in the Board of Governors, to play in certain conferences. The most recent guest team is the Bay Area Dragons.

Season format

Unlike other leagues, there is no "season champion" of the PBA. Instead, the season is divided into conferences or tournaments (not to be confused with the definition of a "conference" in a sporting context as a grouping of teams based on geography or historical affiliation) played in sequence, wherein the teams compete for a conference cup. The winners of the conference cups do not face each other at the end of the season to determine the season champion; instead all conference champions are league champions, with the Philippine Cup being the most prestigious conference of the season.

A season is usually composed of three conferences. Since the 2010–11 season, the conferences were named Philippine, Commissioner's and Governors' Cups, usually ending in a best-of-seven series where the winner took the conference cup. If the same team won all of the conferences, the team was said to be the "Grand Slam" champion. A draft is held after the season-ending Governors' Cup. An opening ceremony, consisting of the presentation of the team's roster and their respective muses, and The Leo Awards (the awarding of several awards such as the MVP of the previous season), is held before the start of the first game of the season. The conference format is similar to Apertura and Clausura in Latin American football.

Each conference usually carries the same tournament format through the years. All conferences begin with a group stage, or an elimination round, akin to the regular season in North American sports leagues, where all teams face each team at least once, and the worst-performing teams are eliminated. With the number of teams increasing to 12, the top 8 teams in the league will advance, and the last four will be eliminated. The elimination round is a single round-robin format; previously, it was a double round-robin, and in some conferences, teams faced certain groups of teams more than once. After the group stage is the playoffs, which consists of the Quarterfinals (Best of three in the Philippine Cup, best of three in the Commisioner's Cup, with the top 2 having a twice-to-beat advantage, and the Governors' Cup, wherein the top 4 teams have a twice-to-beat advantage.), the Semifinals (Best of 7 in the Philippine Cup, and Best of 5 in the Commisioner's and Governors' Cups), and the Finals (Best of 7 Series)

During the Finals of the last conference, the PBA awards its best players in an awarding ceremony. A Rookie Draft is then held after the season for teams to select new players or "rookies". Most draft applicants have played either in the PBA Developmental League (PBA D-League), the PBA's own minor league, or from the collegiate ranks, either in the Philippines and in the United States. The Philippines has an extensive college basketball culture, and this is where the PBA gets most of its players. An offseason usually a couple of months long ends with an opening ceremony to tip off the new season.

With the previous seasons since 2012 being suspended in order to allow players who are members of the Philippine national team to play in FIBA tournaments, they have been lengthened. Originally set from October to July starting in 2004, the last two seasons ended more than a year after it started. There have been calls from within the league to revert to the two-conference format in use from 2004 to 2010 to shorten the season and have it in sync with the FIBA calendar again.

Game rules
The Games and Amusements Board (GAB) has its rules for the size of the basketball court and equipment, which the PBA adapts. The PBA then uses its own set of rules of basketball, independently of FIBA and the NBA. Most non-professional leagues in the Philippines (those not supervised by the GAB) primarily use FIBA rules, so called "amateur rules" in the Philippines, although some still have exceptions.

Game rules have previously been predominantly influenced by the NBA, such as the rules on illegal defenses. After PBA players have been allowed to represent the Philippines in FIBA tournaments, the PBA has adopted FIBA rules piecemeal, including allowing zone defenses, so that the Philippine national team won't be disadvantaged in FIBA competitions.

Eligibility 
Eligibility to participate in the PBA is generally limited to natural born Filipino citizens born in the Philippines. There are player quotas for natural born Filipinos born outside the Philippines, while naturalized Filipinos and foreigners can only play in certain conferences. Coaching is restricted to Filipinos, although longtime foreigner residents and holders of certain visas have been granted exemptions.

Player eligibility

Natural-born Filipino citizens are generally eligible to become part of a PBA team through the PBA draft. Foreigners as well as naturalized Filipino citizens with no Filipino parents can not join the league through the PBA draft; both who could only play as imports, and only on certain conferences.

Filipino players who are aspiring to join the PBA through the draft and are born outside the Philippines are classed as Filipino-foreigners regardless if both their parents are Filipino citizens at the time of their birth. They have to submit documentary proof of their Filipino citizenship from the Department of Justice and the Bureau of Immigration prior to their rookie draft. Filipinos with foreign ancestry who are born in the Philippines are not subject to the same requirements. A team can have a maximum of five Filipino-foreigners players in its roster. Starting the draft for the 2022 season, the Filipino-foreigner cap was increased to seven. Filipino-foreigners would only need a passport and be of Filipino heritage.

Foreigners and naturalized Filipinos can play as imports, but only on import-laden conferences. If a player who is not a natural-born Filipino plays in an all-Filipino conference, it can lead his team forfeiting the wins in games where he took part. Imports are directly hired by teams, and are not drafted. In some conferences where imports are allowed, a height limit is imposed. An import who is over the height limit won't be allowed to play. Most imports are African Americans, but there had been tournaments where other nationalities have played in.

Coach eligibility
Head coaching role for teams in the PBA is generally only available to Filipino citizens since foreigners who are classified as non-resident aliens are bared from serving the role as head coach. It is possible for a foreigner to be a head coach of a PBA team by acquiring permanent residency such as in the case of Tim Cone and Norman Black who married Filipinos and being a holder of a Special Resident Retiree's Visa (SRRV) such as in the case of Rajko Toroman who became eligible for an SRRV after residing in the country for at least five years. The restriction on foreigners has been in place since 1991.

Other regulations 
Players of the PBA sign a Uniform Players' Contract (UPC) when they sign in with a team franchise which plays in the league. The team manager of the concerned team also signs this contract. The UPC includes the bill of rights and privileges as well as obligations and responsibilities of the PBA's players and teams. Players under an active UPC cannot transfer to a team outside the PBA. Consequentially, this prohibits players from taking part in a league other than the PBA (also known colloquially as ligang labas or "outside league"). Although occasionally, players are allowed to temporarily suit up in such games if they secure permission from both their teams and the league management, especially for participations involving charity.

Teams
All franchises are owned by corporations since the league's inception in 1975, being the successor of the Manila Industrial and Commercial Athletic Association, an amateur league which also featured corporate teams. They are not based on geographic locale, so they do not play in a home arena. The names of the teams often changes, often depending on what product or service the owners, like to advertise. A name change could be drastic, to the point of switching industries entirely, such as in the case of the Pepsi Mega Bottlers which changed their names to the Mobiline Cellulars (now TNT Tropang Giga).

A team's name is often divided into two parts; the first is the company or brand name, then the product or a moniker – usually connected to the business of the company. In some cases, the brand name and the moniker can be fused. For example, the San Miguel Beermen is a team owned by the San Miguel Brewery of the San Miguel Corporation, makers of the popular San Miguel Beer brand.

Current teams

Team popularity
In 2008, a survey by the Social Weather Stations showed that Purefoods shares the honor of the league's most popular team along with Barangay Ginebra. It appeared that Ginebra was the most popular team among men, while Purefoods was the most popular among women. Also, Ginebra was more popular in Metro Manila and Luzon and in classes ABC, while Purefoods was more popular in Visayas and Mindanao and in class D. The two teams were tied for most supporters in class E. In terms of percentage of supporters, the survey showed that, after Ginebra and Purefoods (which both got 31%), are Magnolia (21%), Alaska (13%), Sta. Lucia (5%), Red Bull (4%), Talk N' Text (3%), Coca-Cola (1%), and Air 21 (1%).

Notably, the top three teams that have the most supporters have also been considered the most talent-laden teams. They also fall under the San Miguel Corporation umbrella. With these three teams acquiring players through allegedly lopsided trades and performing strong in the past several seasons, the PBA has been considered by some to be an "SMC league".

Defunct and guest teams

The most prominent defunct teams were the Crispa Redmanizers, the Toyota Super Corollas, and the Alaska Aces.

Among the most notable guest teams include the American Nicholas Stoodley team that won the 1980 Invitational Conference, and the Bay Area Dragons of the East Asia Super League, a team based in Hong Kong who brought the 2022–23 Commissioner's Cup Finals to seven games.

Administration

The league is currently headed by a Commissioner, and the Chairman of the PBA Board of Governors. The Commissioner handles the marketing and administration aspects as well as the technical, game related concerns of the PBA and its developmental league. The Chairman of the PBA Board of Governors is elected, together with the Vice Chairman and Board Treasurer before the start of the season among each of the league's representatives to the board.

By tradition, from 1994 to 2017, the incumbent Vice Chairman and Treasurer will assume the Chairmanship and the Vice-Chairmanship respectively the following season.

Commissioners

Presidents and Chairmen of the Board of Governors

Honors

Championships

Awards 
The league awards outstanding Filipino players of the season in the annual Leo Awards. The awards include the Most Valuable Player and the Rookie of the Year. At the end of each conference, the league also awards the Best Player of the Conference for Filipinos and the Bobby Parks Best Import for foreigners.

The PBA Hall of Fame was instituted in 2005 during the 30th anniversary celebration of the league.

Records 
There are all-time records written in Philippine Basketball Association records, as well as distinctions like the PBA career scoring leaders, PBA 2,000 Assists Club, PBA 500 Three-Points Club, PBA 600 Most Games Club, and PBA Top 40 Rebounders.

Rivalries

The most famous matchup was the Crispa-Toyota rivalry of the 1970s.  Fans faithfully supported their favorite squads and appeared in the multitudes at the Araneta Coliseum, or wherever the archrivals had met.  In those days, the players were very passionate.  On one occasion, they engaged in a major brawl, leading to the arrest and detention of several players from both clubs at Fort Bonifacio.

The most heated rivalry in the PBA today is that of two teams representing the Ginebra franchise and the Purefoods franchise. The rivalry is now commonly known as the Manila Clasico. It traces its roots on the original Añejo–Purefoods rivalry of the late 1980s to early 1990s.

Other short-lived or less intense rivalries include:
 Tanduay vs Ginebra (1986–1987 rivalry)
 Ginebra–Shell rivalry (1990s rivalry)
 Purefoods–Swift rivalry (1990s corporate rivalry)
 Añejo/Ginebra vs San Miguel (late-1980s to present rivalry)
 Ginebra/Gordon's Gin vs Alaska (late-1980s–2022)
 Alaska vs Purefoods (late-1980s–2022)
 Alaska vs San Miguel (late-1980s–2022)
 Red Bull vs. the San Miguel franchises (Barangay Ginebra, San Miguel and Purefoods, 2000–2007)
 Talk 'N Text/TNT vs. Petron/San Miguel (2010–present)
 Purefoods/San Mig Coffee/B-Meg/Star/Magnolia vs. Rain or Shine (2009–present, "New Age Rivalry or Kontrapelo")
 Ginebra vs. Meralco (2016–present)

Media coverage
The PBA has been covered by television and other media since its opening day. Their current TV and radio partner is One Sports. Games are being aired on television via TV5, One Sports and PBA Rush with the latter aired in high definition. Radio broadcast is being aired on Radyo Pilipinas 2 (formerly known as DZSR Sports Radio 918) in Mega Manila and selected provincial stations of the Philippine Broadcasting Service. Livestreaming via Cignal Play and Smart GigaPlay. The PBA can also be watched worldwide on Kapatid International and IWant TFC.

PBA on KBS (1975, 1977)
PBA on BBC (1976)
PBA on GTV (1978–1981)
GTV was renamed into MBS in 1980, henceafter the broadcast became known as the PBA on MBS
PBA on Vintage Sports (1982–1999)
Aired on BBC from 1982 to 1983
Aired on MBS/PTV from 1984 to 1995
Aired on IBC from 1996 to 1999
PBA on Viva TV (2000–2002)
Aired on IBC from 2000 to 2002
PBA on NBN and IBC (2003)
Parallel broadcasts on NBN and IBC; later IBC simulcasts of the NBN broadcasts. IBC stopped airing the games in October 2003.
PBA on ABC (2004–2008)
Became known as the PBA on TV5 after ABC reformatted in August 2008.
PBA on Solar Sports (2008–2011)
Aired on Solar TV from October 2008 to February 2011. Also became known as the "PBA on C/S9" before CS/9 re-formatted on November 29, 2009, to Solar TV.
Aired on Studio 23 from February 2011 to August 2011.
Replays also air on Basketball TV.
PBA on One Sports (2011–present)
Aired on IBC from October 2011 to May 2013 under the AKTV on IBC block. The last AKTV programming block aired until May 31, 2013, due to expiration of the blocktime agreement contract between MediaQuest Holdings and IBC.
Aired on TV5 starting with the 2013 PBA Commissioner's Cup Finals. It was moved to IBC under the Sports5 production on August 14, 2013, to September 2013. Airs on primetime (Wednesdays, Fridays and Sundays) and late afternoon (Saturdays) starting from the 2016 Governors' Cup. previously aired on late afternoon (weekends) from 2013–14 season to 2016 Commissioner's Cup.
Aired on TV5 since November 17, 2013. Simulcast with AksyonTV from November 2013 to July 2015.
Simulcast in high definition on Cignal HD Channel 198 with no commercial breaks from May 2014 to 2016. Broadcast with English commentary since January 2016.
Simulcast in high definition on Hyper with no commercial breaks from January 2016 to May 2016 in English commentary.
Simulcast in high definition on PBA Rush from July 2016 to present in English commentary.
Aired via live streaming (Cignal Play App, YouTube, Facebook) from October 2014 to present
PBA on Fox Sports (2013–2016)
Live simulcast of Sunday doubleheaders in English commentary.

Playing venues

As teams do not represent geographic locales, the league itself rents venues for which it plays on. The PBA usually plays a doubleheader three times a week in Metro Manila arenas, and a game on Saturdays in the provinces, popularly known as "out-of-town" games.

A majority of games are held in the Smart Araneta Coliseum in Quezon City and the SM Mall of Asia Arena in Pasay. When both arenas are unavailable, the alternate venues are the Ynares Center in Antipolo, Rizal, PhilSports Arena in Pasig, and the Filoil EcoOil Centre in San Juan. Occasionally, provincial games are hosted in selected venues throughout the country. Playoff games are usually held at venues in Metro Manila, most often at the Smart Araneta Coliseum. However, recent incentives to promote the league throughout the country have resulted in out-of-town playoff games.

The league has also played several times outside the Philippines, the majority in Dubai where there is a large Filipino community.

See also 
 The Leo
 List of sports attendance figures – the PBA in a global context
 PBA Developmental League
 PBA Rush
 Nicknames used in PBA
 National Basketball League (Philippines)
 Maharlika Pilipinas Basketball League
 Pilipinas Super League
 Filbasket
 Pilipinas VisMin Super Cup
 Chooks-to-Go Pilipinas 3x3

References

External links
 PBA official website

 
1975 establishments in the Philippines
Basketball leagues in the Philippines
Sports leagues established in 1975
Professional sports leagues in the Philippines